Tainan metropolitan area is the urban area of Tainan City in southern Taiwan.

Definition
According to the definition of metropolitan areas formerly used by the government, Tainan metropolitan area includes the following areas:

However, since the merger of Tainan City and the former Tainan County, the term is no longer in official usage.

References 

Metropolitan areas of Taiwan